The 1951 Mediterranean Games football tournament was the 1st edition of the Mediterranean Games men's football tournament. The football tournament was held in Alexandria, the Egypt between 14–18 October 1951 as part of the 1951 Mediterranean Games.

Participating teams
The following countries have participated for the final tournament:

Venues

Squads

Final tournament
All times local : CET (UTC+2)

Matches

Tournament classification

Winner

Statistics

Goalscorers

References

1951
Sports at the 1951 Mediterranean Games
1951 in African football
1951 in Asian football
1951